Norman Donald Nilson (1927-2017) was an Australian rugby league footballer who played in the 1940s and 1950s.

Playing career
Norm "Nipper' Nilson was the Souths' reserve grade captain was called into the front row for Souths NSWRFL grand final 12–11 win over Newtown in 1955.

Post playing
'Nipper' Nilson later served a period as Souths' club president.

Death
Nilson died on 18 August 2017 at his home at Port Macquarie, New South Wales age 90.

References

1927 births
2017 deaths
Australian rugby league players
South Sydney Rabbitohs players
Rugby league props
Rugby league second-rows
Rugby league players from Sydney